Poems from the Straight Path: A Book of Islamic Verse is a 2017 collection of Islamic poetry by British-New Zealand scholar and poet Joel Hayward. It was Hayward’s third published poetry collection and his twelfth book in general.

Summary
Joel Hayward’s third book of poems, Poems from the Straight Path: A Book of Islamic Verse contains poems about his journey in search of knowledge and wisdom. Poems address issues of life, death, fate, religion, pain, and suffering.

Reviews 
Passion Islam’s review states that "Hayward’s journey of exploration, transformation and illumination forms the beating heart of this moving collection of poetry [which is] a timely and important work that reveals the struggle and profound insights of someone bridging cultures and faith traditions."

References 

2017 poetry books
British poetry collections
Islamic poetry
 Poetry books
Poetry collections
Islamic philosophical poetry books
Books by Joel Hayward